A scenic Byway in Ohio can be any interstate, national highway, state highway, County road, municipal street, or Township road in the State of Ohio as designated by the director of transportation.

Byways

References

External links
 Ohio Scenic Byways Program official website